WMBO may refer to:

 WMBO (AM), a radio station (1340 AM) licensed to serve Auburn, New York, United States
 WNDR-LP, a low-power television station (channel 6) licensed to serve Auburn, New York, which held the call sign WMBO-LP from 2016 to 2017
 WVOA-LD, a low-power television station (channel 6) licensed to serve Westvale, New York, which held the call sign WMBO-LP from 1998 to 2013
 Wolf Moon Blood Orgy, a gag in the youtube animated series Purgatony (Season 1, Episode 6)  by Explosm